The Daughters of the American Revolution (DAR) is a lineage-based membership service organization for women who are directly descended from a person involved in the United States' struggle for independence. A non-profit group, they promote education and patriotism. The organization's membership is limited to direct lineal descendants of soldiers or others of the Revolutionary period who aided the cause of independence; applicants must have reached 18 years of age and are reviewed at the chapter level for admission. The DAR has over 185,000 current members in the United States and other countries. Its motto is "God, Home, and Country".

Founding

In 1889 the centennial of President George Washington's inauguration was celebrated, and Americans looked for additional ways to recognize their past. Out of the renewed interest in United States history, numerous patriotic and preservation societies were founded. On July 13, 1890, after the Sons of the American Revolution refused to allow women to join their group, Mary Smith Lockwood published the story of patriot Hannah White Arnett in The Washington Post, asking, "Where will the Sons and Daughters of the American Revolution place Hannah Arnett?" On July 21 of that year, William O. McDowell, a great-grandson of Hannah White Arnett, published an article in The Washington Post offering to help form a society to be known as the Daughters of the American Revolution. The first meeting of the society was held August 9, 1890.

The first DAR chapter was organized on October 11, 1890, at the Strathmore Arms, the home of Mary Smith Lockwood, one of the DAR's four co-founders. Other founders were Eugenia Washington, a great-grandniece of George Washington, Ellen Hardin Walworth, and Mary Desha. They had also held organizational meetings in August 1890. Other attendees in October were Sons of the American Revolution members Registrar General Dr. George Brown Goode, Secretary General A. Howard Clark, William O. McDowell (SAR member #1), Wilson L. Gill (secretary at the inaugural meeting), and 18 other people.

The First Lady, Caroline Lavina Scott Harrison, wife of President Benjamin Harrison, lent her prestige to the founding of DAR, and served as its first President General. Having initiated a renovation of the White House, she was interested in historic preservation. She helped establish the goals of DAR, which was incorporated by congressional charter in 1896.

In this same period, such organizations as the Colonial Dames of America, the Mary Washington Memorial Society, Preservation of the Virginia Antiquities, United Daughters of the Confederacy, and Sons of Confederate Veterans were also founded. This was in addition to numerous fraternal and civic organizations flourishing in this period.

Structure
The DAR is structured into three Society levels: National Society, State Society, and Chapter.  A State Society may be formed in any US State, the District of Columbia, or other countries that are home to at least one DAR Chapter. Chapters can be organized by a minimum of 12 members, or prospective members, who live in the same city or town.

Each Society or Chapter is overseen by an executive board composed of a variety of officers.  National level officers are: President General, First Vice President General, Chaplain General, Recording Secretary General, Corresponding Secretary General, Organizing Secretary General, Treasurer General, Registrar General, Historian General, Librarian General, Curator General, and Reporter General, to be designated as Executive Officers, and twenty-one Vice Presidents General.  These officers are mirrored at the State and Chapter level, with a few changes: instead of a President General, States and Chapters have Regents, the twenty-one Vice Presidents General become one Second Vice Regent position, and the title of "General" is replaced by the title of either "State" or "Chapter". Example: First Vice President General becomes State First Vice Regent.

Historic programs

The DAR chapters raised funds to initiate a number of historic preservation and patriotic endeavors. They began a practice of installing markers at the graves of Revolutionary War veterans to indicate their service, and adding small flags at their gravesites on Memorial Day.

Other activities included commissioning and installing monuments to battles and other sites related to the War. The DAR recognized women patriots' contributions as well as those of soldiers. For instance, they installed a monument at the site of a spring where Polly Hawkins Craig and other women got water to use against flaming arrows, in the defense of Bryan Station (present-day Lexington, Kentucky).

In addition to installing markers and monuments, DAR chapters have purchased, preserved, and operated historic houses and other sites associated with the war.

DAR Hospital Corps (Spanish–American War, 1898) 
In the 19th century, the U.S. military did not have an affiliated group of nurses to treat servicemembers during wartime. At the onset of the Spanish–American War in 1898, the U.S. Army appointed Dr. Anita Newcomb McGee as Acting Assistant Surgeon to select educated and experienced nurses to work for the Army. As Vice President of the DAR (who also served as NSDAR's first Librarian General), Dr. McGee founded the DAR Hospital Corps to vet applicants for nursing positions. The DAR Hospital Corps certified 1,081 nurses for service during the Spanish–American War. DAR later funded pensions for many of these nurses who did not qualify for government pensions. Some of the DAR-certified nurses were trained by the American Red Cross, and many others came from religious orders such as the Sisters of Charity, Sisters of Mercy, and Sisters of the Holy Cross. These nurses served the U.S. Army not only in the United States but also in Cuba and the Philippines during the war. They paved the way for the eventual establishment—with Dr. McGee's assistance—of the Army Nurse Corps in 1901.

Textbook committees 
During the 1950s, statewide chapters of the DAR took an interest in reviewing school textbooks for their own standards of suitability. In Texas, the statewide "Committee on Investigations of Textbooks" issued a report in 1955 identifying 59 textbooks currently in Texas public schools that had "socialistic slant" or "other deficiencies" including references to "Soviet Russia" in the Encyclopedia Britannica. In 1959, the Mississippi chapter's "National Defense Committee" undertook a state lobbying effort that secured an amendment to state law which added "lay" members to the committee reviewing school textbooks. A DAR board member was appointed to one of the seats.

Contemporary DAR
There are nearly 180,000 current members of the DAR in approximately 3,000 chapters across the United States and in several other countries. The organization describes itself as "one of the most inclusive genealogical societies" in the United States, noting on its website that, "any woman 18 years or older — regardless of race, religion, or ethnic background — who can prove lineal descent from a patriot of the American Revolution, is eligible for membership". The current DAR President General is Pamela Rouse Wright, the founder and owner of a jewelry and luxury goods business in Texas.

Eligibility
Membership in the DAR today is open to all women, regardless of race or religion, who can prove lineal bloodline descent from an ancestor who aided in achieving United States independence. The National Society DAR is the final arbiter of the acceptability of the documentation of all applications for membership.

Qualifying participants in achieving independence include the following:
 Signatories of the United States Declaration of Independence;
 Military veterans of the American Revolutionary War, including State navies and militias, local militias, privateers, and French or Spanish soldiers and sailors who fought in the American theater of war;
 Civil servants of provisional or State governments, Continental Congress and State conventions and assemblies;
 Signers of Oath of Allegiance or Oath of Fidelity and Support;
 Participants in the Boston Tea Party or Edenton Tea Party;
 Prisoners of war, refugees, and defenders of fortresses and frontiers; doctors and nurses who aided Revolutionary casualties; ministers; petitioners; and
 Others who gave material or patriotic support to the Revolutionary cause.

The DAR published a book, available online, with the names of thousands of minority patriots, to enable family and historical research. Its online Genealogical Research System (GRS) provides access to a database, and it is digitizing family Bibles to collect more information for research.

The organization has chapters in all 50 U.S. states and in the District of Columbia. DAR chapters have been founded in Australia, Austria, the Bahamas, Bermuda, Canada, France, Germany, Italy, Japan, Mexico, Spain, and the United Kingdom.  The DAR is a governing organization within the Hereditary Society Community of the United States of America, and each DAR President General has served on HSC's board since its inception.

Education outreach

The DAR contributes more than $1 million annually to support five schools that provide for a variety of special student needs.
Supported schools:
Kate Duncan Smith DAR School, Grant, Alabama
Crossnore School, Crossnore, North Carolina
Hillside School, Marlborough, Massachusetts
Hindman Settlement School, Hindman, Kentucky
Berry College, Mount Berry, Georgia

In addition, the DAR provides $70,000 to $100,000 in scholarships and funds to American Indian youth at Chemawa Indian School, Salem, Oregon; Bacone College, Muskogee, Oklahoma; and the Indian Youth of America Summer Camp Program.

Civic work 

DAR members participate in a variety of veteran and citizenship-oriented projects, including:
 
 Providing more than 200,000 hours of volunteer time annually to veterans in U.S. Veterans Administration hospitals and non-VA facilities
 Offering support to America's service personnel in current conflicts abroad through care packages, phone cards and other needed items
 Sponsoring special programs promoting the Constitution during its official celebration week of September 17–23
 Participating in naturalization ceremonies

Exhibits and library at DAR Headquarters
The DAR maintains a genealogical library at its headquarters in Washington, DC and provides guides for individuals doing family research. Its bookstore presents scholarship on United States and women's history.

Temporary exhibits in the galleries have featured women's arts and crafts, including items from the DAR's quilt and embroidery collections. Exhibit curators provide a social and historical context for girls' and women's arts in such exhibits, for instance, explaining practices of mourning reflected in certain kinds of embroidery samplers, as well as ideals expressed about the new republic. Permanent exhibits include American furniture, silver and furnishings.

Literacy promotion
In 1989, the DAR established the NSDAR Literacy Promotion Committee, which coordinates the efforts of DAR volunteers to promote child and adult literacy. Volunteers teach English, tutor reading, prepare students for GED examinations, raise funds for literacy programs, and participate in many other ways.

American history essay contest
Each year, the DAR conducts a national American history essay contest among students in grades 5 through 8.  A different topic is selected each year.  Essays are judged "for historical accuracy, adherence to topic, organization of materials, interest, originality, spelling, grammar, punctuation, and neatness."  The contest is conducted locally by the DAR chapters.  Chapter winners compete against each other by region and nationally; national winners receive a monetary award.

Scholarships
The DAR awards $150,000 per year in scholarships to high school graduates, and music, law, nursing, and medical school students. Only two of the 20 scholarships offered are restricted to DAR members or their descendants.

Segregation and exclusion of African Americans, and later inclusion 
In 1932 the DAR adopted a rule excluding African-American musicians from performing at DAR Constitution Hall in response to complaints by some members against "mixed seating," as both black and white people were attracted to concerts of black artists. In 1939, they denied permission for Marian Anderson to perform a concert. First Lady Eleanor Roosevelt resigned from the organization. In her letter to the DAR, Roosevelt wrote, "I am in complete disagreement with the attitude taken in refusing Constitution Hall to a great artist... You had an opportunity to lead in an enlightened way and it seems to me that your organization has failed." As the controversy grew, the American press overwhelmingly backed Anderson's right to sing. The Philadelphia Tribune wrote, "A group of tottering old ladies, who don't know the difference between patriotism and putridism, have compelled the gracious First Lady to apologize for their national rudeness." The Richmond Times-Dispatch wrote, "In these days of racial intolerance so crudely expressed in the Third Reich, an action such as the D.A.R.'s ban... seems all the more deplorable." At Eleanor Roosevelt's behest, President Roosevelt and Walter White, then-executive secretary of the NAACP, and Anderson's manager, impresario Sol Hurok arranged an open-air concert on the steps of the Lincoln Memorial with a dignified and stirring rendition of "America (My Country, 'Tis of Thee)". The event attracted a crowd of more than 75,000 in addition to a national radio audience of millions.

The DAR officially reversed its "white performers only" policy in 1952. However, in 1957, the Colorado branch of the DAR refused to allow a Mexican-American child to participate in an Abraham Lincoln birthday event.

In 1977, Karen Batchelor Farmer (now Karen Batchelor) of Detroit, Michigan, was admitted to the Ezra Parker Chapter (Royal Oak, MI) as the first known African-American member of the DAR. Batchelor's admission as the first known African-American member of DAR sparked international interest after it was featured in a story on page one of The New York Times. In 1984, Lena Lorraine Santos Ferguson, a retired school secretary, was denied membership in a Washington, D.C. chapter of the DAR because she was Black, according to a report by The Washington Post. Ferguson met the lineage requirements and could trace her ancestry to Jonah Gay, a white man who fought in Maine. When asked for comment, Sarah M. King, the President General of the DAR, told The Washington Post that the DAR's chapters have autonomy in determining members. King went on to tell Washington Post reporter Ronald Kessler, "Being black is not the only reason why some people have not been accepted into chapters. There are other reasons: divorce, spite, neighbors' dislike. I would say being black is very far down the line....There are a lot of people who are troublemakers. You wouldn't want them in there because they could cause some problems." After King's comments were reported in a page one story, outrage erupted, and the D.C. City Council threatened to revoke the DAR's real estate tax exemption. King quickly corrected her error, saying that Ferguson should have been admitted, and that her application had been handled "inappropriately". DAR changed its bylaws to bar discrimination "on the basis of race or creed." In addition, King announced a resolution to recognize "the heroic contributions of black patriots in the American Revolution."

Since the mid-1980s, the DAR has supported a project to identify African-Americans, Native Americans, and individuals of mixed race who were patriots of the American Revolution, expanding their recognition beyond soldiers. In 2008, DAR published Forgotten Patriots: African-American and American Indian Patriots in the Revolutionary War. In 2007, the DAR posthumously honored one of Thomas Jefferson's slaves, Mary Hemings Bell, as a "Patriot of the Revolution." Because of Hemings Bell's declaration by the DAR to be a Patriot, all of her female descendants qualify for membership in the DAR. Wilhelmena Rhodes Kelly, in 2019, became the first African-American elected to the DAR National Board of Management when she was installed as New York State Regent in June.

Notable members

Living members

 Betsy Boze, American academic, chief executive officer and dean, Kent State University Stark
Ada E. Brown, first African-American woman federal judge appointed by President Donald Trump and confirmed by the Senate, and first African-American woman on the United States District Court for the Northern District of Texas in its 140-year history. Second Native American woman to become a federal judge
 Laura Bush, former First Lady of the United States
 Rosalynn Carter, former First Lady of the United States, politician, political and social activist
 Bo Derek, actress, former model, and veterans advocate
 Elizabeth Dole, former U.S. Senator from North Carolina, former transportation secretary, labor secretary, American Red Cross president, Federal Trade Commissioner, presidential candidate, and presidential advisor
Tammy Duckworth, American Army veteran, former U.S. Representative, and from 2017, U.S. Senator from Illinois.  Duckworth is depicted along with Molly Pitcher in a statue sponsored by the DAR Illinois chapter and dedicated to women veterans on the grounds of the Brehm Memorial Library in Mt. Vernon, Illinois
 Candace Whittemore Lovely, painter
 Dr. Donna J. Nelson, chemistry professor
 Katie Pavlich, conservative commentator, author, blogger, and podcaster
 Margaret Rhea Seddon, NASA astronaut
 Carol Burnett, American actress, comedian, singer, and writer

Deceased members

 Jane Addams, activist and Nobel Peace Prize winner
 Mary Jane Aldrich (1833–1909), American temperance reformer and lecturer
 Susan B. Anthony, American suffragist
 Lillie Stella Acer Ballagh, national chairman of Colonial Relics
 Mary Ross Banks (1846–1910), litterateur and author
 Clara Barton, American Red Cross founder
 Octavia Williams Bates (1846–1911), suffragist, clubwoman, author
 Frances E. Burns (1866–1937), social leader, business executive
 Mary Temple Bayard (1853–1916), American writer, journalist
 Cora M. Beach, State Chairman and member of National Committee for Genealogical and Historical Research
 Clara Bancroft Beatley (1858–1923), educator, lecturer, author
 Ella A. Bigelow (1849–1917), author and clubwoman
 Sarah Bond Hanley, first Democratic woman to serve in the Illinois House of Representatives. She served as the Illinois State Regent.
 Leah Belle Kepner Boyce, State Recording and Secretary of the California Daughters of the American Revolution
 Gene Bradford (1909–1937), member of the Washington State House of Representatives
 Alice Willson Broughton (1889–1980), First Lady of North Carolina
 Olivia Dudley Bucknam, Hollywood chapter
 Eleanor Kearny Carr (1840–1912), First Lady of North Carolina
 Luella J. B. Case (1807–1857), author
 Marietta Stanley Case (1845–1900), poet and temperance advocate
 Annetta R. Chipp (1866-1961), temperance leader and prison evangelist
 Florence Anderson Clark (1835–1918), author, newspaper editor, librarian, university dean
 Vinnie B. Clark, established and developed the Geography Department at the San Diego State Teachers College
 Clara Rankin Coblentz (1863-1933), social reformer
 Sarah Johnson Cocke (1865–1944), writer and civic leader
 Margaret Wootten Collier (1869-1947), author
 Emily Parmely Collins (1814–1909) – suffragist, activist, writer
 Harriet L. Cramer (1847–1922) – newspaper publisher
 Inez Mabel Crawford, first registrar of the General Edward Hand Chapter
 Belle Caldwell Culbertson (1857–1934), author and philanthropist
 Carrie Chase Davis (1863–1953), American physician, suffragist
 Margaret B. Denning (1856-1935), missionary and temperance worker
 Allie Luse Dick (1859–1933), music teacher
 Estelle Skidmore Doremus, supporter of the New York Philharmonic
 Ella Loraine Dorsey (1853–1935), author, journalist, translator
 Fanny Murdaugh Downing (1831–1894), author and poet
 Saidie Orr Dunbar, Executive Secretary of the Oregon Tuberculosis Association
 Caroline B. Eager, American philanthropist who worked mainly with the Igorot people of the Philippine Islands
 Ida Horton East (1842-1915), philanthropist
 Mary Baker Eddy, founder of Christian Science church
 Isabel H. Ellis, Rubidoux Chapter
 Margaret Dye Ellis (1845-1925), social reformer and lobbyist 
 Lelia Dromgold Emig (1872–1957), genealogist
 Infanta Eulalia of Spain, Spanish princess and author
 Laura Dayton Fessenden (1852–1924), author 
 Inglis Fletcher, American writer
 Mary Alice Fonda (1837–1897), American musician, linguist, author, critic
 Abigail Keasey Frankel, prominent club and civic worker of Portland. She was the first president of the Oregon Federation of Business and Professional Women
 Agnes Moore Fryberger (1868–1939), music educator
 Dale Pickett Gay, Wyoming clubwoman and one of the best known women of her time in the oil business
 Wilma Anderson Gilman (1881–1971), concert pianist, music teacher, clubwoman
 Lillian Gish, actress
 Fannie Smith Goble, held several high offices in Daughters of the American Revolution organization
 Isophene Goodin Bailhache, national vice chairman of Historic Spots, State Officer, Chapter Regent
 Gene Grabeel, mathematician and cryptanalyst who founded the Venona project
 Harriet A. Haas, attorney and member of Piedmont Board of Education
 Inez M. Haring, American botanist
 Sallie Foster Harshbarger, from 1920 to 1922, State Regent of the Daughters of the American Revolution
 Caroline Harrison, former First Lady of the United States
 Mary Hilliard Hinton, historian, painter, anti-suffragist, pro-racial segregation
 Emily Caroline Chandler Hodgin, temperance reformer
 Margaret Gardner Hoey, First Lady of North Carolina
 Grace Hopper, Rear Admiral, USNR
 Anna Morris Holstein (1825–1900), Founder First Regent D.A.R. Valley Forge Chapter, Hosted 1891 DAR National Leadership visit to Valley Forge, Prayer Desk Dedicated at VF Memorial Chapel in her honor, Founder, Regent Centennial and Memorial Association, Civil War Nurse, Author. 
 Harriet Lane Huntress (1860–1922), Deputy Superintendent Public Instruction in New Hampshire
 Electa Amanda Wright Johnson (1938–1929), philanthropist, writer
 Rebecca Richardson Joslin (1846–1934), writer, lecturer, benefactor, clubwoman
 Sara Beaumont Kennedy (1859–1920), writer and newspaper editor
 Mary Lewis Langworthy (1872-1949), teacher, writer, lecturer, and executive
 Nancy A. Leatherwood, national chairman of Historical and Literary Reciprocity Committee of the Daughters of the American Revolution
 Colonel Westray Battle Long, Director of the Women's Army Corps
 Edith Bolte MacCracken, State Regent of the Daughters of the American Revolution 
 Mary Stuart James MacMurphy (1846–1934), teacher, lecturer, clubwoman, and author
 Virginia Donaghe McClurg, member
 Ruth Karr McKee, member
 Moina Michael, educator and originator of Memorial Day Poppies
 Anne Hazen McFarland, M.D., physician and medical journal editor
 Anita Newcomb McGee, founder of the Army Nurse Corps
Anne Rogers Minor, artist and DAR President General, 1920–1923
 Fanny E. Minot (1847–1919), national president Woman's Relief Corps
 Bessie Morse, founder of The Morse School of Expression, St. Louis
 Sara E. Morse, held positions in several organizations
 Grandma Moses, folk artist
 Alice Curtice Moyer
 Emma Huntington Nason (1845–1921), poet, author, and musical composer
 Jacqueline Noel, leader in promoting the colonial history of the United States
 Florence Sillers Ogden, columnist, conservative activist, and segregationist
 Elizabeth Fry Page (?–1943), author, editor
 Jane Marsh Parker (1836–1913), author, historian, clubwoman
 Fannie Brown Patrick, musician and leader in civic and social affairs
 Alice Paul, American suffragist
 Edith Allen Phelps, twice president of the Oklahoma Library Association, the first professional in the Library Science field in the Oklahoma City system
 Sarah Childress Polk, First Lady of the United States
 Frances Porcher, officer of the Jefferson Chapter
 Delia Lyman Porter (1858–1933), author, social reformer, clubwoman
 Adele Poston, pioneer in the field of psychiatric nursing
 Ada E. Purpus, member
 Emily Lee Sherwood Ragan, author, journalist
 Emma May Alexander Reinertsen (1853–1920), writer
 Janet Reno, former Attorney General of the United States
 Hester Dorsey Richardson (1862–1933), author
 Alice Mary Robertson, educator and public servant from Oklahoma, second woman to serve in the United States Congress
 Lelia P. Roby, regent, DAR; founder, Ladies of the Grand Army of the Republic
 Emily Warren Roebling, engineer, known for her contribution to the completion of the Brooklyn Bridge 
 Ginger Rogers, actress and dancer
 Eleanor Roosevelt, First Lady of the United States. She resigned her membership in protest of racism.
 Fannie Forbis Russel, one of the pioneer women of the state of Montana
 Susan Augusta Pike Sanders, national president of the Woman's Relief Corps
 Phyllis Schlafly, conservative political activist and writer
 Julia Green Scott, DAR President General 
 M. Elizabeth Shellabarger, Registered Nurse, army nurse overseas during World War I and director of American Red Cross Nursing Service in Albania and Montenegro
 Jessamine Shumate, noted artist and cartographer
 Eva Munson Smith (1843–1915), composer, poet, author
 Lura Eugenie Brown Smith (1864–?), journalist, newspaper editor, author
 Margaret Chase Smith, US Congresswoman and US Senator
 Mary Bell Smith (1818–1894), educator and temperance leader
 Helen Norton Stevens, Lady Stirling Chapter
 Mary Ingram Stille (1854-1935), historian, journalist, and temperance reformer
 Lillian Carpenter Streeter (1854–1935), social reformer, clubwoman, author
 Vera Blanche Thomas, president of the Arizona State Nurses' Association from 1927 to 1928
 Adaline Emerson Thompson (1859–1951), benefactor and educational leader
 Martha L. Poland Thurston (1849–1898), vice-president of the national body; also social leader, philanthropist, writer
 Lydia H. Tilton (1839–1915), lyricist of "Old Glory", the D.A.R. national song
 Lizabeth A. Turner (1829–1907), National President, Woman's Relief Corps
 Gertrude Vaile (1878–1954), social worker
 Gertrude Vanderbilt Whitney, sculptor, art patron and collector, and founder in 1931 of the Whitney Museum of American Art
 Maryly Van Leer Peck, Founder of Guam Community College, first female president of a Florida Community College, first woman chemical engineer graduate from Vanderbilt University. Received the National Community Service Award from DAR.
 Florence Warfield Sillers, historian and socialite, founding member of the Mississippi Delta Chapter
 Jennie O. Starkey (ca. 1856 – 1918) was an American journalist
 Elizabeth Willisson Stephen (1856–1925), author
 Fay Webb-Gardner, First Lady of North Carolina
 Agnes Wright Spring, member
 Adelaide Cilley Waldron (1843–1909), author, editor, clubwoman
 Margaret Ray Wickens (1843–1918), national president of the Woman's Relief Corps

List of DAR presidents general
The presidents general of the society have been:

*Note: During the Watkins administration, the President General and other National Officers began to be referred to by their own first names, rather than their husbands'.

Honors
A memorial to the Daughters of the American Revolution's four founders, at Constitution Hall in Washington, D.C., was dedicated on April 17, 1929. It was sculpted by Gertrude Vanderbilt Whitney, a DAR member.

See also 

The Hereditary Society Community of the United States of America
Children of the American Revolution
Colonial Dames of America
The National Society of the Colonial Dames of America
Society of the Cincinnati
Sons of the American Revolution
Sons of the Revolution
Sons of Union Veterans of the Civil War
The United Empire Loyalists Association of Canada
United States Daughters of 1812

References

Works cited

Further reading

 Independent accounts
Anderson, Peggy. The Daughters (1972)
Bailey, Diana L. American Treasure: The Enduring Spirit of the DAR, Walsworth Publishing Company (2007)
Julie Des Jardins, Women and the Historical Enterprise in America: Gender, Race, and the Politics of Memory, 1880–1945, University of North Carolina Press (2003)
Strayer, Martha. The D.A.R.: An Informal History, Washington, DC. Public Affairs Press (1958) (critically reviewed by Gilbert Steiner as covering personalities but not politics, Review, The Annals of the American Academy of Political and Social Science, v.320, "Highway Safety and Traffic Control" (Nov. 1958), pp. 148–49.)
 Wendt, Simon. The Daughters of the American Revolution and Patriotic Memory in the Twentieth Century (U Press of Florida, 2020) online review
Sara Wallace Goodman (2020) "'Good American citizens': a text-as-data analysis of citizenship manuals for immigrants, 1921–1996." Journal of Ethnic and Migration Studies

 DAR-related 
Hunter, Ann Arnold. A Century of Service: The Story of the DAR. Washington, DC: National Society Daughters of the American Revolution (1991). 
Simkovich, Patricia Joy. Indomitable Spirit: The Life of Ellen Hardin Walworth, Washington, DC: National Society Daughters of the American Revolution  (2001). (The life story of Ellen Hardin Walworth, one of the NSDAR founders.)
125 Years of Devotion to America, Washington, DC: National Society Daughters of the American Revolution.  DAR publication that includes reflections, prayers and ceremonial excerpts to capture material about the DAR and its members' service.

External links

American Patriotic Societies Directory list by US War Period(s) (AVSOPS.com)
National Society Daughters of the American Revolution, Official website
"DAR Historic Sites and Database", includes national map
Forgotten Patriots: African American and American Indian Patriots in the Revolutionary War, DAR, information about minority patriots

Daughters of the American Revolution (David Reese Chapter) Collection (MUM00098), University of Mississippi
"Daughters of the American Revolution Library", FamilySearch Research Wiki, for genealogists
"Daughters of the American Revolution", image by Grant Wood
"A Guide to the National Society of the Daughters of the American Revolution, Massanutton Chapter Records, 1885–2005" James Madison University's Massanutten Chapter, National Society of Daughters of the American Revolution Collection, 1885–2005

Second Oldest D.A.R. Chapter historical marker in Atlanta, Georgia
Toaping Castle Chapter, National Society Daughters of the American Revolution records at the University of Maryland Libraries
 The American Revolution Institute

 
American Revolution veterans and lineage organizations
Charities based in Washington, D.C.
History of women in the United States
Magazine publishing companies of the United States
Nonpartisan organizations in the United States
Organizations established in 1890
Patriotic and national organizations chartered by the United States Congress
Women's organizations based in the United States
1890 establishments in Washington, D.C.
Lineage societies